Tudor is a subdivision of Mombasa, Kenya.

Geography 
The area is located to the north of Mombasa Island, bordered by Jomo Kenyatta Avenue to the south-west and Tudor Creek to the north-east.

Technical University of Mombasa.[Formerly known as Mombasa Polytechnic] 
Tudor is the location of Technical University of Mombasa, a higher education facility offering subjects in engineering, business and sciences.
The institution is offering certificate,  diploma,  degree and PhD levels although mostly in the School of Business

References 

Populated places in Coast Province
Mombasa